Civolution is a provider of technology and services for identifying, managing and monetizing audio and video media content. The company offers a portfolio of proprietary and patented digital watermarking (audio and video) and digital audio and video fingerprinting technology for media protection: forensic tracking of media assets in pre-release, digital cinema, Pay TV and online; media intelligence: audience measurement, broadcast monitoring, internet and radio tracking; media interaction: automatic content recognition and triggering for second screen and connected television.

History and ownership 

Civolution is a spin-off from Royal Philips Electronics of the Netherlands.

The first digital watermarking activities started in the Philips Research labs in 1996, after several years of research and development on the technology. The first commercialization activities started four years later.

In 2002, a dedicated business line, Philips Content Identification, was formed to further develop the technology, particularly in the domains of monitoring and forensic tracking applications using Philips audio and video digital watermarking technology, and the recently developed audio and video digital fingerprinting technology. The same year, Philips Content Identification signed a joint venture agreement with corporate news and multimedia services provider Medialink, to launch Teletrax, the world's first global broadcast intelligence service.  
Philips Content Identification digital watermarking technology was used for identifying the source of illegal copies of the 2003 Academy Award Screeners and by the major Hollywood Studio's for protecting pre-release material and theatrical releases content.

In 2006, the Philips Content Identification business unit introduced a forensic marking solution for digital cinemas. The technology allows unlicensed copies of content from digital theatre to be traced back to the time, date and location where the illegal copy occurred.

A few months later a digital watermarking solution for the Pay TV environment was deployed. Designed for set-top box integration, the technology uniquely watermarks and identifies content delivered to individual Pay TV subscribers and hospitality TV screens. Whenever Pay TV content is accessed or distributed, a watermark is applied into the video stream in real-time. Any redistributed content can be traced back to a specific Pay TV subscriber or viewer.

Philips content Identification assumed, in September 2008, full ownership of its joint venture Teletrax and completed a spin-off from Philips Corporate Technologies as a stand-alone company Civolution B.V. backed by venture capital firm Prime Technology Ventures.

On July 21, 2009, Civolution announced that it had acquired Thomson Software and Technology Solution (STS) watermarking business from Thomson. As a result of the amalgamation, Thomson became a shareholder in Civolution.

In December 2014, WPP's Kantar Media acquired Civolution's SyncNow audio watermarking unit supporting Audience Measurement and Second Screen synchronization applications 

Following the Kantar Media acquisition, Civolution announced the launch of two separate business units, NexGuard and Teletrax.

Civolution has offices in Eindhoven (The Netherlands), London (UK), Rennes (France), New York City, Burbank (Los Angeles).

In July 2016, Kudelski Group acquired Civolution's market leading NexGuard Forensic Watermarking business supporting content tracking solutions for pre-release, digital cinema, pay TV and streaming.

Technology 

Civolution offers a suite of products and solutions using proprietary and patented digital watermarking and fingerprinting technologies.
Civolution digital watermarking (audio and video) technology is applied in a number of applications for pre-release, digital cinema, Pay-TV, online content delivery, synchronization, remote triggering, broadcast monitoring. 
The fingerprinting solutions find applications in synchronization, content triggering, broadcast and internet intelligence including monitoring and monetization services.

Content identification technologies allow owners, distributors, aggregators, advertisers and publishers of video or audio content to protect their media content and deter copyright infringement as well as measure usage and control their assets. The latest advancements in both digital watermarking and fingerprinting technologies have allowed new applications and business models for synchronization, triggering and monetization of content.

The latest development in watermarking and fingerprinting technologies are now seeing new applications enabling the automatic content recognition and triggering of specific events to smart devices.  
Upon client-based identification through audio watermarking or fingerprinting, Civolution enables identification and synchronization between broadcast, on-demand or recorded television content and interactive applications on devices such as a tablets, smartphones or laptops. The automatic content recognition technology is available for integration with smart TVs.

The automatic content recognition and synchronization technology has been deployed by Red Bee Media for The Walking Dead'' by FX (UK). 

Another capability offered by the technology for 2nd screen and smart TV application providers, as well as social TV platforms, is a server-side content triggering service that provides real-time recognition of broadcast content such as advertisements, movies, TV series, music, and more. By automatically notifying application providers in real time of what content is airing on which channel, such service allows for the synchronization of value-added functionality such as content-specific background information, hyperlinks, and synchronized social newsfeeds, all within the developer's second screen or smart TV applications. Application providers can thereby offer users a more powerful and engaging TV-synchronized experience.
The service enables application providers to work more deeply with advertising agencies and brands to further monetize their app platforms. Through the real-time ad identification and triggering service, synchronized ads or ad-interactivity can be delivered to 2nd screens, extending the advertising experience over multiple screens in a synchronized manner. The company has also partnered with Vetrya on mobile platform technology.

Global operations 

Civolution is headquartered in Eindhoven (The Netherlands) and has offices in Rennes (France) London (UK), New York, Hollywood and Hong Kong. 
Its Teletrax service currently tracks and monitors over 2,000 television channels worldwide through a network of monitoring stations located in Europe, Middle East, Asia, North and South America.

Affiliations 

Civolution is among the 12 founding members of the Digital Watermarking Alliance, an organization that was formed to promote and educate the public about the benefits of digital watermarking technology.

References 

Mass media companies of the Netherlands
Mass media in Eindhoven